Dickson is a town in Carter County, Oklahoma, United States. The population was 1,207 at the 2010 census. It is part of the Ardmore, Oklahoma Micropolitan Statistical Area.

Life
Dickson has no post office, so residents are served by the USPS in Ardmore. The town is home to many employees who work in Ardmore's manufacturing plants and light industrial businesses. There are a few businesses at the crossroads of U.S. Highway 177 and State Highway 199, including a bank, gas station, day care, church, and bulldozer service. Most residents travel into Ardmore (which is approximately 10 miles west) to either work or shop.

Geography
Dickson is located at the eastern end of Carter County, at  (34.192140, -96.991160). It is bordered to the west by Ardmore, the county seat, to the east by Mannsville in Johnston County, and to the south partially by Marshall County.

U.S. Route 177 passes through the center of town, leading north  to Sulphur and southeast  to Madill. Oklahoma State Highway 199 leads west from the center of Dickson  to the center of Ardmore.

Demographics

As of the census of 2000, there were 1,139 people, 417 households, and 334 families residing in the town. There were 462 housing units at an average density of 32.6 per square mile (12.6/km2). The racial makeup of the town was 85.34% White, 0.44% African American, 10.18% Native American, 0.18% from other races, and 3.86% from two or more races. Hispanic or Latino of any race were 1.84% of the population.

There were 417 households, out of which 35.0% had children under the age of 18 living with them, 66.7% were married couples living together, 9.8% had a female householder with no husband present, and 19.9% were non-families. 18.9% of all households were made up of individuals, and 7.2% had someone living alone who was 65 years of age or older. The average household size was 2.73 and the average family size was 3.10.

In the town, the population was spread out, with 27.7% under the age of 18, 7.6% from 18 to 24, 27.8% from 25 to 44, 25.4% from 45 to 64, and 11.5% who were 65 years of age or older. The median age was 37 years. For every 100 females, there were 98.1 males. For every 100 females age 18 and over, there were 97.4 males.

The median income for a household in the town was $33,409, and the median income for a family was $39,375. Males had a median income of $28,571 versus $21,188 for females. The per capita income for the town was $14,821. About 6.2% of families and 8.6% of the population were below the poverty line, including 7.1% of those under age 18 and 10.2% of those age 65 or over.

Education
Dickson public schools serve the town of Dickson. Several Carter county schools have consolidated into the Dickson school district, and it is one of the largest districts in Oklahoma. In the mid 1990s, the cross country team won the state tournament for three years in a row. The powerlifting team won the Oklahoma Large-School team championship in 2008. Dickson High School has been named a Blue Ribbon School of Excellence by the U.S. Department of Education.

References

External links

 Encyclopedia of Oklahoma History and Culture - Dickson

Towns in Carter County, Oklahoma
Towns in Oklahoma
Ardmore, Oklahoma micropolitan area